Phyllomacromia flavimitella is a species of dragonfly in the family Corduliidae. It is found in Central African Republic, the Democratic Republic of the Congo, Uganda, and possibly the Republic of the Congo. Its natural habitats are subtropical or tropical moist lowland forests and rivers. It is threatened by habitat loss.

References

Corduliidae
Taxonomy articles created by Polbot